Hunting the Northern Godard is a Canadian drama film, directed by Éric Morin and released in 2013. Inspired by influential film director Jean-Luc Godard's visit to the Abitibi-Témiscamingue region of Quebec in 1968, the film centres on the developing relationship between Paul (Martin Dubreuil), a musician from Montreal who accompanied Godard on the trip, and Marie (Sophie Desmarais), a young woman from Rouyn-Noranda who becomes drawn into a love triangle between Paul and her boyfriend Michel (Alexandre Castonguay).

The character of Paul was based on Pierre Harel of Offenbach.

Dubreuil's real-life garage rock band Les Breastfeeders appear in the film as Paul's band Les Tragédiens. Godard himself is a minor character in the film, portrayed by musician Jean-Philippe Goncalves, and the film includes narration by playwright René-Daniel Dubois.

The film received five Jutra Award nominations at the 16th Jutra Awards in 2014, for Best Art Direction (Marie-Hélène Lavoie), Best Costume Design (Caroline Bodson), Best Makeup (Maïna Militza), Best Hairstyling (Militza) and Best Sound (Yann Cleary and Martin Rouillard).

References

External links

2013 films
2013 drama films
Canadian drama films
Films set in Abitibi-Témiscamingue
Films shot in Quebec
French-language Canadian films
2010s Canadian films